Aayudham may refer to:

 Aayudham (1982 film), a 1982 Malayalam-language film
 Aayudham (1990 film), a 1990 Telugu-language film
 Aayudham (2003 film), a 2003 Telugu-language film
 Aayudham (2005 film), a 2005 Tamil-language film
 Aayudham (2008 film), a 2008 Malayalam-language film
 Aayudham Seivom, a 2008 Tamil-language film